Steadman was a British indie rock band.  Steadman's first album, Loser Friendly, was released in the United Kingdom in 2000 on lead singer Simon Steadman's own label, Freeloader Recordings. Steadman released their second album, Revive, in 2003 for Elektra Records.  The album was produced by Alain Johannes and Natasha Shneider.

Personnel
 Simon Steadman (lead vocals and guitar)
 Russel Field (drums and vocals)
 David Walton (bass)
 Paul Phillips (guitar)
 Ellie Wyatt (strings and keyboard)

History

Influenced by the Britpop-bands Oasis and Radiohead, Steadman were also compared to The Verve.

When Elektra Records dissolved, the band lost their recording deal as a result.

The band has played shows with acts including Jason Mraz, Jet, Ash, Ian McCulloch of Echo & the Bunnymen, Feeder, Michelle Branch and Stereolab. Their music has been featured on The Sims 2: University ("Come On") as well as the films Love Wrecked ("Wave Goodbye"), New York Minute ("Wave Goodbye"), Failure to Launch ("Forget My Heart"), Slither ("Sad World") and According to Spencer ("Come Alive"), and has received airplay on several US radio stations.

In addition the band appeared as themselves on the TV shows Smallville, Charmed, Las Vegas, Judging Amy and Black Sash, and American Dreams as the Dave Clark Five, as well as guest spots on The Late Late Show with Craig Kilborn and The Sharon Osbourne Show. They also played a concert in a virtual world MMORPG known as There.com on 16 November 2003. The band played their songs on a stage in the There headquarters while their corresponding avatars played virtual instruments and sang in There.

In mid-2005 Steadman released all their music as free downloads on their website under a Creative Commons licence.

Loser Friendly 
Loser Friendly was  the band's first album as Steadman. This album was released by Steadman's own label, Freeloader Recordings, in 2000. It sold approximately 2000 copies.

Revive 
This is Steadman's most popular album to date. The track "Wave Goodbye" was featured in television shows, movies, and soundtracks such as Smallville and New York Minute. "No Big Deal" was featured on Charmed.

External links 
 Steadman collection at the Internet Archive's live music archive
 [ Loser Friendly review on all-music guide]
 [ Revive review on all-music guide]

English rock music groups
Creative Commons-licensed authors